Euptera debruynei is a butterfly in the family Nymphalidae. It is found in the north-eastern part of the Democratic Republic of the Congo. Finder Werner De Bruyne

References

Butterflies described in 1990
Euptera
Endemic fauna of the Democratic Republic of the Congo